Calaveritas ("little skulls" in Spanish; formerly, Upper Calaveritas) is an unincorporated community in Calaveras County, California. The community is in ZIP code 95249 and area code 209.

Founded by Mexicans in 1849, the mining camp was relatively successful and by 1853, Calaveritas was well established, with one livery stable, two butcher shops, several general stores, restaurants, saloons, gambling halls, and fandango houses. Notorious bandit Joaquin Murrieta was supposedly a frequent visitor to the latter two.

The town reached its peak in 1857, with an estimated population of around 800, the majority being Mexican or Chinese, but on August 3, 1858, a fire destroyed some of the buildings. By this time, the gold production had declined and some of its inhabitants moved to other locales.

The town today is registered as California Historical Landmark #255.

Early on, the town was called Upper Calaveritas to distinguish it from another settlement Lower Calaveritas about 3.5 miles to the west. Lower Calaveritas has since become abandoned.

Politics

References

External links

Unincorporated communities in California
Unincorporated communities in Calaveras County, California
California Historical Landmarks
Populated places established in 1849
1849 establishments in California